At  the Hochkelberg is one of the ten highest mountains in the Vulkan Eifel in Germany. It is a former stratovolcano, at the southern foot of which lies the Mosbrucher Weiher, an explosion crater lake or  maar. Below the summit of the Hochkelberg is a transmission tower.

Originally the mountain which is visible today lay 200 metres below the surface. When the region was uplifted the outer layers were carried away leaving the hard basaltic core.

The slopes of the Hochkelberg are covered today with dense beech woods with a variety of species. The ruins of Roman buildings may also be seen here.

References 

Vulkaneifel
Mountains and hills of Rhineland-Palatinate
Mountains and hills of the Eifel
Mountains under 1000 metres